John Stephen Monks, Baron Monks (born 5 August 1945) is a Labour Co-operative member of the House of Lords and former trade unionist leader, who served as the General Secretary of the Trades Union Congress (TUC) in the UK from 1993 until 2003. He also served as the General Secretary of the European Trade Union Confederation (ETUC) from 2007 until 2011, having been made a Life peer in 2010.

Early life
Monks was born in Blackley, Manchester, and educated at Ducie Technical School in Moss Side. He studied Economic History at the University of Nottingham.

Career
From 1967 to 1969, he was a management trainee and junior manager with Plessey in Surrey.

TUC
He joined the TUC in 1969 and by 1977 was the head of the Organisation and Industrial Relations Department, and the Deputy General Secretary in 1987, leading to his election in 1993 as General Secretary.

ETUC
He was General Secretary of the European Trade Union Confederation, based in Brussels, between 2003 and 2011.

Other Interests

Monks has also sat on numerous other bodies, including Acas from 1979 until 1995. In 2000, he agreed to chair the Co-operative Commission, reporting in 2001 with recommendations for the co-operative movement. He was also President of the British Airline Pilots Association. He was a non-executive director of Thompsons Solicitors between 2010 and 2019 and was a visiting professor at the University of Manchester. He is a vice – president of Justice for Colombia and of the Smith Institute, and President of the Involvement and Participation Association.
Monks has honorary degrees from the universities of Nottingham, Salford, Manchester(UMIST), Cranfield, Cardiff, Southampton, Kingston and the Open University. He is also a Fellow of the City and Guilds of London Institute.

House of Lords 
He took his seat in the House of Lords on 11 October 2010, having been created a life peer on 26 July 2010 as Baron Monks, of Blackley in the County of Greater Manchester. 

In August 2014, Monks was one of 200 public figures who were signatories to a letter to The Guardian opposing Scottish independence in the run-up to September's referendum on that issue.

He was appointed a Chevalier of the Légion d'Honneur (2014).

References

External links
 ETUC
 Guardian December 2002
 Guardian September 2002

1945 births
Living people
General Secretaries of the Trades Union Congress
Alumni of the University of Nottingham
People from Blackley
Labour Party (UK) life peers
Life peers created by Elizabeth II
People educated at Ducie Technical High School for Boys
Trade unionists from Manchester